Giudici is an Italian surname. Notable people with the surname include:

Battista dei Giudici (1428–1484), Italian bishop
Carlo Maria Giudici (1723–1804), Italian painter
Enzo Giudici (1920–1985), Italian academic, specialising in French Renaissance literature
Gianni Giudici (born 1946), Italian racing driver
Giorgio Giudici (born 1945), Swiss architect and politician
Giovanni Giudici (1924–2011), Italian poet and journalist
Lena Giudici (1898-1995), American lawyer and clubwoman
Luca Giudici (born 1992), Italian football player
Luigi De Giudici (1887–1955), Italian painter 
Catherine Giudici (born 1986), American graphic designer and reality television star 
Paolo Emiliani Giudici (1812–1872), Italian writer
Pietro Giudici (1921-2002), Italian racing cyclist
Reinaldo Giudici (1853-1921), Italian-born Argentine painter

See also
Giudice

Italian-language surnames